Daejeonjochajang station is a railway station on the Gyeongbu Line and Honam Line in South Korea.

Railway stations in Daejeon